Martin Dillon (born 1949) is a Northern Irish author.

Martin Dillon may also refer to:

Martin Dillon (musician) (1957–2005), American musician
Martin Andrew Dillon (1826–1913), Irish soldier